Kiviuq is a prograde irregular satellite of Saturn. It was discovered by J. J. Kavelaars in 2000, and given the temporary designation S/2000 S 5. It was named after Kiviuq, a hero of Inuit mythology. 

It is a member of the Inuit group of irregular satellites. It is light red, and the Kiviupian (Kiviuqan) infrared spectrum is very similar to the Inuit-group satellites Siarnaq and Paaliaq, supporting the thesis of a possible common origin of the Inuit group in the break-up of a larger body.

Kiviuq is believed to be in Kozai resonance, cyclically reducing its orbital inclination while increasing the eccentricity and vice versa. Its current orbital elements overlap strongly with Phoebe's orbit, and the moons will likely eventually collide with each other.

The light curve amplitude of Kiviuq is large, varying in brightness by over 2 magnitudes. The large amplitude of Kiviuq suggests that it has an elongated shape, and may be a possible contact binary.

Exploration
On 30 August 2010, the ISS camera of the Cassini–Huygens spacecraft took light-curve data from a distance of 9.3 million km. With these data, the rotation period was measured to 21 hours and 49 minutes.

References 

Ephemeris from IAU-MPC NSES

External links

David Jewitt pages

Inuit group
Moons of Saturn
Irregular satellites
Discoveries by Brett J. Gladman
Astronomical objects discovered in 2000
Moons with a prograde orbit
Discoveries by John J. Kavelaars